Elk Hill is a historic plantation house located near Forest, Bedford County, Virginia. It was built about 1797, and consists of a -story, three bay brick central section with flanking wings in the Federal style. It has a slate gable roof and a front porch added in 1928, when restored by the architect Preston Craighill. The main block has twin brick exterior chimneys.  Also on the property are a contributing small, handsome brick office, a weatherboarded cook's house and storeroom, a lattice wellhouse, and icehouse.

It was listed on the National Register of Historic Places in 1973.

References

Plantation houses in Virginia
Houses on the National Register of Historic Places in Virginia
Federal architecture in Virginia
Houses completed in 1797
Houses in Bedford County, Virginia
National Register of Historic Places in Bedford County, Virginia
1797 establishments in Virginia